Ethan Allen Hitchcock Shepley (May 3, 1896 – June 21, 1975) was the chancellor of Washington University in St. Louis from 1953 until 1961.

Early years
Ethan Allen Hitchcock Shepley, a descendant of early American revolutionary Ethan Allen, was born in St. Louis in 1896. His father and grandfather were both graduates of Washington University in St. Louis. Shepley earned his undergraduate degree at Yale and entered Harvard Law School, but finished his law degree at Washington University in St. Louis in 1922.

He practiced law in St. Louis and became active in state politics. After stepping down as chancellor, he was the Republican Party's candidate for governor in 1964.

Washington University
Shepley became chancellor in 1953, the first alumnus to hold the position. He oversaw the transition of the university from a "streetcar college" for local students to a national university with a majority of its students from outside the region. A major fund raising drive led to a new round of construction, including the John M. Olin Library, Urbauer Hall for engineering, Busch Laboratory for biology, and Steinberg Hall for the Gallery of Arts, as well as several new dormitories on the South 40.

External links
 Washington University in St. Louis
 Biographical entry at Washington University in St. Louis

1896 births
1975 deaths
Yale University alumni
Harvard Law School alumni
Chancellors of Washington University in St. Louis
Missouri Republicans
Washington University in St. Louis alumni
Washington University School of Law alumni
Washington University in St. Louis faculty